Corneliu Popovici (born 26 September 1970) is a Moldovan politician. He served as Minister of Education, Culture and Research from 14 November 2019 to 16 March 2020 in the cabinet of Prime Minister Ion Chicu.

References 

Living people
1970 births
Place of birth missing (living people)
21st-century Moldovan politicians